The IBA official cocktails are cocktails recognised by the International Bartenders Association (IBA) to be the most requested recipes.

List of cocktails
IBA official cocktails are divided into three categories:  unforgettables, contemporary classics, and new era drinks.

Unforgettables

 Alexander  Made with cognac, cocoa liqueur (crème de cacao), and cream; this recipe is called a Brandy Alexander.
 Americano  Made with Campari, sweet vermouth, and for the sparkling version, club soda and garnished with a slice of lemon.
 Angel face  Made with gin, apricot brandy and calvados in equal amounts.
 Aviation  Made with gin, maraschino liqueur, crème de violette, and lemon juice. Some recipes omit the crème de violette.
 Between the sheets  Made with white rum (or other light rum), cognac, triple sec, and lemon juice.
 Boulevardier  Made with bourbon or rye whiskey, sweet red vermouth, and bitter Campari.
 Brandy crusta  Made with brandy, maraschino liqueur, curaçao, fresh lemon juice, sugar syrup, and Angostura bitters.
 Casino  Made with gin, maraschino liqueur, orange bitters and fresh lemon juice.
 Clover Club  Made with gin, lemon juice, raspberry syrup, and an egg white.
 Daiquiri  Made with rum, citrus juice (typically lime juice), and sugar or other sweetener.
 Dry martini  Made with gin and vermouth, and garnished with an olive or a lemon twist. A dry martini specifically is a martini made with dry, white vermouth.
 Gin fizz  Made with gin, lemon juice, and sugar, which are shaken with ice, poured into a tumbler and topped with carbonated water.
 Hanky panky  Made with gin, sweet vermouth, and Fernet-Branca.
 John Collins  A Collins cocktail—that is, a long drink stirred with ice and topped with soda—made from London dry gin (or Bourbon whiskey), lemon juice, sugar and carbonated water.
 Last word  Made with equal amounts of gin, green Chartreuse, maraschino liqueur and freshly pressed lime juice, which are combined in a shaker with ice. After shaking, the mix is poured through a cocktail strainer (sieve) into the glass so that the cocktail contains no ice and is served "straight up".
 Manhattan  Made with whiskey, sweet vermouth, and bitters.
 Martinez  A classic cocktail made from gin, sweet vermouth, maraschino liqueur and orange bitters that is widely regarded as the direct precursor to the Martini.
 Mary Pickford  Made with white rum, fresh pineapple juice, grenadine, and maraschino liqueur. It is served shaken and chilled, often with a maraschino cherry.
 Monkey gland  Made with gin, orange juice, grenadine and absinthe. Created in the 1920s by Harry MacElhone, owner of Harry's New York Bar in Paris, France.
 Negroni  An Italian cocktail made with one part gin, one part vermouth rosso (red, semi-sweet), and one part Campari, garnished with orange peel.
 Old fashioned  Made by muddling sugar with bitters, adding whiskey or, less commonly, brandy, and garnishing with a twist of citrus rind and a cocktail cherry.
 Paradise  Made with gin, apricot brandy (apricot liqueur), and orange juice in a 2:1:1 ratio, with a splash of lemon juice.
 Planter's punch  Made with Jamaican rum, fresh lime juice, and sugar cane juice.
 Porto flip  Made with brandy, ruby port, and one egg yolk.
 Ramos fizz  Made with gin, lemon juice, lime juice, egg white, sugar, cream, orange flower water, and soda water.  It is served in a large non-tapered 12 to 14 ounce Collins glass.
 Rusty nail  Made by mixing Drambuie and Scotch whisky.
 Sazerac  A local New Orleans variation of a cognac or whiskey cocktail, named for the Sazerac de Forge et Fils brand of cognac brandy that served as its original main ingredient. The drink is most traditionally a combination of cognac or rye whiskey, absinthe, Peychaud's Bitters, and sugar, although bourbon whiskey is sometimes substituted for the rye and Herbsaint is sometimes substituted for the absinthe.
 Sidecar  Made with cognac, orange liqueur (Cointreau, Grand Marnier, Dry Curaçao, or some other triple sec), plus lemon juice.
 Stinger  Duo cocktail made by adding crème de menthe to brandy (although recipes vary).
 Tuxedo  Made with gin, dry vermouth, orange bitters, maraschino and absinthe.
 Vieux Carré  Made with rye whiskey, cognac, sweet vermouth liqueur, Bénédictine, and Peychaud's bitters.
 Whiskey sour  Mixed drink containing whiskey (often bourbon), lemon juice, sugar, and optionally, a dash of egg white.
 White lady  Essentially a sidecar made with gin in place of brandy.  What makes it different from the simple gin sour is the switching of sugar for triple sec. The cocktail sometimes also includes additional ingredients, for example egg white, sugar, or cream.

Contemporary classics

 Bellini  Made with Prosecco and peach purée or nectar.
 Black Russian  Made with vodka and coffee liqueur.
 Bloody Mary  Made with vodka, tomato juice, and other spices and flavorings including Worcestershire sauce, hot sauces, garlic, herbs, horseradish, celery, olives, salt, black pepper, lemon juice, lime juice and celery salt.
 Caipirinha Brazil's national cocktail, made with cachaça (sugarcane hard liquor), sugar, and lime.
 Champagne cocktail  Made with sugar, Angostura bitters, Champagne, brandy and a maraschino cherry as a garnish.
 Corpse reviver #2  Consists of equal parts gin, lemon juice, curaçao (commonly Cointreau), Kina Lillet (now usually replaced with Cocchi Americano, as a closer match to Kina Lillet than modern Lillet Blanc), and a dash of absinthe.
 Cosmopolitan  Made with vodka, triple sec, cranberry juice, and freshly squeezed or sweetened lime juice.
 Cuba libre  Made with cola, rum, and in many recipes lime juice on ice.
 French 75  Made from gin, Champagne, lemon juice, and sugar.
 French Connection  Made with equal parts cognac and amaretto liqueur.
 Golden dream  Made with Galliano, triple sec, orange juice and cream.
 Grasshopper  Made with equal parts green crème de menthe, white crème de cacao, and cream shaken with ice and strained into a chilled cocktail glass.
 Hemingway special  Made with rum, lime juice, maraschino liqueur, and grapefruit juice and served in a double cocktail glass.
 Horse's neck  Made with brandy (or sometimes bourbon) and ginger ale, with a long spiral of lemon peel draped over the edge of an 'old-fashioned' or highball glass.
 Irish coffee  Made with hot coffee, Irish whiskey, and sugar, stirred, and topped with cream. The coffee is drunk through the cream. 
 Kir  Made with a measure of crème de cassis (blackcurrant liqueur) topped up with white wine.
 Long Island iced tea  Typically made with vodka, tequila, light rum, triple sec, gin, and a splash of cola, which gives the drink the same amber hue as its namesake.
 Mai Tai  Based on rum, Curaçao liqueur, orgeat syrup, and lime juice, associated with Polynesian-style settings.
 Margarita  Made with tequila, orange liqueur, and lime juice often served with salt on the rim of the glass.
 Mimosa  Made with Champagne (or other sparkling wine) and chilled citrus juice, usually orange juice unless otherwise specified.
 Mint julep  Made primarily with bourbon, sugar, water, crushed or shaved ice, and fresh mint.
 Mojito  Made with white rum, sugar (traditionally sugar cane juice), lime juice, soda water, and mint.
 Moscow mule  Made with vodka, spicy ginger beer, and lime juice, garnished with a slice or wedge of lime.
 Piña colada  Made with rum, cream of coconut or coconut milk, and pineapple juice, usually served either blended or shaken with ice.
 Pisco sour  The Peruvian pisco sour uses Peruvian pisco as the base liquor and adds freshly squeezed lemon juice, simple syrup, ice, egg white, and Angostura bitters. The Chilean version is similar, but uses Chilean pisco and pica lime, and excludes the bitters and egg white. Other variants of the cocktail include those created with fruits like pineapple or plants such as coca leaves.
 Sea breeze  Made with vodka, cranberry juice, and grapefruit juice.
 Sex on the beach  Made with vodka, peach schnapps, orange juice and cranberry juice.
 Singapore sling  A gin-based sling cocktail from Singapore.
 Tequila sunrise  Made with tequila, orange juice, and grenadine syrup.
 Vesper  Originally made of gin, vodka, and Kina Lillet. The formulations of its ingredients have changed since its original publication in print, and so some modern bartenders have created new versions which attempt to more closely mimic the original taste.
 Zombie  Made with fruit juices, liqueurs, and various rums.

New era drinks

 Barracuda  Made with gold rum, Galliano liqueur, pineapple juice, fresh lime juice and top with Prosecco.
 Bee's knees  Made with gin, fresh lemon juice, and honey. It is served shaken and chilled, often with a lemon twist.
 Bramble  Made with dry gin, lemon juice, sugar syrup, crème de mûre (blackberry liqueur), and crushed ice.
 Canchanchara  Made with Cuban aguardiente, honey, and fresh lime juice.
 Dark 'n' stormy  Made with Goslings Black Seal Rum (the "dark") and ginger beer (the "stormy") served over ice and garnished with a slice of lime.
 Espresso martini  Made with vodka, espresso coffee, coffee liqueur, and sugar syrup. It is not a true martini as it contains neither gin nor vermouth, but is one of many drinks that incorporate the term into their names.
 Fernandito  A long drink of Argentine origin consisting of the Italian amaro liqueur fernet and cola, served over ice.
 French martini  The key ingredient that makes a martini "French" is Chambord, a black raspberry liqueur that has been produced in France since 1685.
 Illegal  Made with mezcal, Jamaica overproof white rum, Falernum, maraschino liqueur, lime juice, simple syrup, and optionally a few drops of egg white.
 Lemon drop martini  A vodka-based cocktail that is prepared with the addition of lemon juice, triple sec and simple syrup.
 Naked and famous  Made with equal parts mezcal, yellow Chartreuse, Aperol, and fresh lime juice.
 New York sour  Made with whiskey (rye or bourbon), simple syrup, lemon juice, egg white, and red wine (Shiraz or Malbec).
 Old Cuban  Created in 2001 by mixologist Audrey Saunders, it is made with aged rum, fresh lime juice, simple syrup, Angostura bitters, mint leaves, and topped with Champagne brut.
 Paloma  Most commonly prepared by mixing tequila, lime juice, and a grapefruit-flavored soda such as Fresca, Squirt, or Jarritos and served on the rocks with a lime wedge. Adding salt to the rim of the glass is also an option.
 Paper plane  Made with equal parts bourbon, Aperol, the amaro liqueur Amaro Nonino, and lemon juice.
 Penicillin  Made with whisky, ginger, and fresh lemon juice.
 Russian spring punch  Made with vodka, crème de cassis, sugar syrup, and lemon juice.
 Southside  Made with gin, lemon juice, simple syrup and mint (also known as "South Side").
 Spicy fifty  Made with vodka, elderflower cordial, honey syrup, red chili pepper, and fresh lemon juice.
 Spritz  Made with Prosecco, bitters and soda water.
 Suffering bastard  Name for two different mixed drinks, one being more of a standard cocktail associated with World War II and the other being more of an exotic drink associated with Tiki bars.
 Tipperary  Made with Irish whiskey, sweet red Vermouth, green Chartreuse, and Angostura bitters.
 Tommy's margarita  Made with tequila, lime juice, and agave nectar or simple syrup and orange bitters served in a cocktail glass. It is distinct from the margarita in its omission of orange liqueur and its preferred substitution of agave nectar to highlight the natural agave notes in tequila.
 Trinidad sour  Made with Angostura bitters, orgeat syrup, lemon juice, and rye whiskey.
 Ve.n.to  Made with white smooth grappa, lemon juice, honey mix (made with chamomile infusion if desired), chamomile cordial, and optionally egg white.
 Yellow bird  Made with white rum, Galliano, triple sec, and lime juice.

Former entries

The following drinks were removed as of the 2020 update of the list:

 B-52
 Bacardi
 Derby
 Dirty martini
 Godfather
 Godmother
 Harvey Wallbanger
 Kamikaze
 Rose
 Screwdriver
 Vampiro

See also

 List of cocktails
 List of cocktails (alphabetical)
 List of national drinks

References

Further reading

External links
 IBA Official Cocktail list

Cocktails
Mixed drinks